Denizli Atatürk Stadium is a multi-purpose stadium in Denizli, Turkey.  It is currently used mostly for football matches and is the home ground of Denizlispor.  The stadium holds 18,745 people and was built in 1950.

References

External links
Venue information

Football venues in Turkey
Sport in Denizli
Sports venues completed in 1950
Multi-purpose stadiums in Turkey
Süper Lig venues
Athletics (track and field) venues in Turkey
Buildings and structures in Denizli Province
Denizlispor
Things named after Mustafa Kemal Atatürk